The  — generally translated as Graduate School of Management and Business Administration, but officially branded as EGADE Business School since 2010 — is the graduate business school of the Monterrey Institute of Technology (ITESM): one of Latin America's largest private universities and one of the most prestigious business universities in the Americas.

Founded in 1995 as a group of business schools attached to some of the institute's campuses, a national reorganization in 2010 merged most of them into a semi-autonomous, national graduate school divided in two sites: one serving the metropolitan area of Monterrey — where its rectorate is — and another serving the metropolitan area of Mexico City.

The school is generally ranked among the best in Latin America by most international financial publications (see Rankings) and in 2008 its Monterrey campus became the fourth in the region and the first in Mexico  to achieve simultaneous accreditation by the United States' AACSB, the European Quality Improvement System (EQUIS) and the British AMBA. At the time only 34 business schools in the world were holding this ranking.

 its academic programs include executive, full-time, part-time and in-company master's degrees in Business Administration and Finance; doctorate degrees; and more than a dozen double degrees with business schools from overseas (see Joint programs and international partnerships below).

History

The earliest forerunner of the school was founded on 1 September 1964 as 'Escuela de Graduados en Administración' (Graduate School of Management), a small department attached to the Monterrey campus of the Monterrey Institute of Technology (ITESM). The project was funded partially through a  grant from the Ford Foundation, which was an active promoter of Alliance for Progress — a United States program that attempted to counterbalance Communist influence in Latin America (particularly in the aftermath of the Cuban Revolution) by sponsoring economic and social development in the region. Similar agreements, aiming to provide "advanced training for faculty members from business schools in emerging countries" had funded the Getulio Vargas Foundation of Brazil (1954), ESAN in Peru (1962), and INCAE (originally in Nicaragua, 1964).

In its first year, the school was offering a single master's degree in Management to 17 full-time and 37 part-time students. By 1968 it had 395, including students from the United States, three from the Netherlands and 41 non-Mexican Latin Americans. The short-lived institution, however, was disbanded in the 1970s, when the institute restructured itself, centralized most of its academic departments around academic divisions, and transferred its graduate degrees to local campuses.

Commonly shortened as EGADE, it brought early successes. Barely 10 years after its foundation its MBA degree was ranked among the top ten in the world by The Wall Street Journal.

Such encouraging results allowed its first director, Wharton alumnus Jaime Alonso Gómez, to become the first Latin American scholar in history to be named 'Dean of the Year' by the Academy of International Business. It prompted the gradual creation of homologous schools in six more campuses. They shared the same academic curricula but, as peripheral institutions bound to local campuses, found themselves replicating organization structures and forced to seek costly international accreditation individually. A major reorganization of postgraduate studies at ITESM in 2010 merged three out of seven into a semi-autonomous, national graduate school under a new name: EGADE Business School.

Organization

The EGADE Business School is affiliated to the Monterrey Institute of Technology and Higher Education (ITESM), one of the largest private, coeducational and secular universities in Latin America. The institute briefly became part of the Monterrey Institute of Technology System (Sistema Tecnológico de Monterrey), an umbrella organization of non-profit and research-oriented institutions ranging from education to health services restructured in 2013.

Inside the institute's organizational structure, the school is attached to a national rectorate for postgraduate schools chaired by María de Lourdes Dieck-Assad, a former ambassador of Mexico to the European Union. Its operations and long-term vision are overseen by a board of trustees, chaired by Carlos Salazar Lomelín, CEO of FEMSA: the largest public bottler of Coca-Cola products in the world in sales volume. The board is staffed by Latin American businesspeople and politicians, such as Pedro Pablo Kuczynski, former prime minister of Peru, and the late Paulo Renato Souza, former minister of Education of Brazil.

Since 2014 the school is in two sites serving large metropolitan areas: one in Monterrey — where the flagship school and rectorate is in the suburb of San Pedro Garza García — and one in Mexico City, serving the Santa Fe business district.

Academics

Admissions

Since its creation, the school requires every applicant to achieve a minimum pass mark at its own academic aptitude test for postgraduate studies (Prueba de Admisión a Estudios de Posgrado, PAEP): an instrument designed and maintained by academics of the institute (with some guidance provided by the technical director of The College Board office in Puerto Rico).

The school is most selective in local and international student selection for the last few years. The selection process includes evaluating PAEP/GMAT score, TOEFL or equivalent score, recommendation letter, minimum prior job experience, personal interview. The admission committee reviews applications on an individual basis, looking at both quantitative and qualitative aspects of an applicant's professional and academic background, and will assess potential for academic success and future professional growth.

Rankings

 its OneMBA program, delivered in partnership with four institutions (see Joint programs and international partnerships below) was ranked 24th worldwide by the Financial Times in its 2012 Executive Master in Business Administration rankings. The school is ranked first in Latin America in the Quacquarelli Symonds Global 200 Business Schools Report 2013-2014, first in Latin America according to América Economía and third in Mexico according to CNN/Expansión (2013).

The school had been ranked seventh among the best business schools outside the United States according to The Wall Street Journal (2006), fourth in the world in business ethics and social-responsibility programs according to BusinessWeek magazine (2005) and 88th among the 100 best MBA programs in the world by The Economist (2010).

Joint programs and international partnerships

The OneMBA degree is offered through a partnership with the University of North Carolina at Chapel Hill, the Rotterdam School of Management of the Netherlands, the Chinese University of Hong Kong and the Getulio Vargas Foundation of Brazil and is ranked 24th worldwide among executive MBAs by the Financial Times.
The Global MBA for Latin American Managers is offered in partnership with the Thunderbird School of Global Management, which has been ranked consistently by U.S. News & World Report as the #1 school in International Management since 1995.
The Master of Business Administration with a concentration in Global Business and Strategy (MBA-GBS) is a double-degree program offered jointly with the Belk College of Business at the University of North Carolina at Charlotte.

See also
Monterrey Institute of Technology and Higher Education

References

External links

Monterrey Institute of Technology and Higher Education
Business schools in Mexico
Postgraduate schools in Mexico
Educational institutions established in 1995
1995 establishments in Mexico